Kanagawa 18th district (神奈川県第18区, Kanagawa-ken dai-jyūhakku or 神奈川18区, Kanagawa jyūhakku) is a constituency of the House of Representatives in the Diet of Japan (national legislature). It is located in western Kawasaki. The district consists of the wards of Takatsu, Miyamae and Nakahara. As of December 1, 2020, 449,625 eligible voters were registered in the district.

In 2003, the first election since the establishment of this electoral district, Takkeshi Hidaka of the Democratic Party was elected, and Daishirō Yamagiwa of the Liberal Democratic Party was proportionally restored. Since then, he has alternated between Yamagiwa in 2005 and Hidaka in 2009, but since 2012, Yamagiwa has continued to be elected.

List of members representing the district

Election results

2021

2017

2014

2012

2009

2005

2003

References 

Kanagawa Prefecture
Districts of the House of Representatives (Japan)